This article displays the squads for the 2019 World Men's Handball Championship. Each team consisted of 16 players.

Age, club, appearances and goals correct as of 10 January 2019.

Group A

Brazil
A 28-player squad was announced on 10 December 2018. A 20-player squad was revealed on 16 December 2018. The final squad was announced on 3 January 2019.

Head coach: Washington Nunes

France
A 20-player squad was revealed on 10 December 2018. The final squad was revealed on 8 January 2019.

Head coach: Didier Dinart

Germany
A 28-player squad was announced on 10 December 2018. A 18-player squad was revealed on 21 December 2018. The final squad was revealed on 6 January, Tobias Reichmann and Tim Suton were excluded from the squad.

Head coach: Christian Prokop

Korea
A 28-player squad was announced on 10 December 2018. The final team was announced on 18 December 2018, with sixteen players from South Korea and four North Korean players joined the team on 22 December 2018 and formed a single team with a total of 20 players.

Head coach: Cho Young-shin

Russia
A 28-player squad was announced on 10 December 2018. A 21-player squad was revealed on 24 December 2018. On 3 January the squad was reduced to 19 players. The final sqad was announced on 9 January 2019.

Head coach: Eduard Koksharov

Serbia
A 28-player squad was announced on 10 December 2018. A 21-player squad was revealed on 31 December 2018. The final squad was revealed on 8 January 2019. Nemanja Zelenović and Vladimir Cupara were replaced by Milan Milić and Dejan Milosavljev on 14 January 2019.

Head coach: Nenad Peruničić

Group B

Bahrain
A 18-player squad was announced on 27 December 2018. On 7 January, Ali Abdulqader was excluded from the squad due to an injury.

Head coach:  Aron Kristjánsson

Croatia
A 28-player squad was announced on 10 December 2018. A 19-player squad was revealed on 17 December 2018. On 1 January 2019, four players were excluded and five players were added. On 2 January, Josip Božić Pavletić was replaced by Ivan Vida due to an injury. On 5 January Damir Bičanić was added to the squad. On 6 January Filip Ivić and Luka Šebetić were excluded from the squad. The final squad wes announced on 8 January 2019.

Head coach: Lino Červar

Iceland
A 28-player squad was announced on 10 December 2018. A 21-player squad was revealed on 20 December 2018. On 1 January the squad was reduced to 17 players. On 9 January the final squad was revealed, Guðjón Valur Sigurðsson was excluded from the squad due to injury and replaced with Bjarki Már Elísson.

Head coach: Guðmundur Guðmundsson

Japan
A 21-player squad was revealed on 11 December 2018. The final squad was announced on 17 December 2019. Motoki Sakai was replaced by Ryosuke Sasaki on 26 December.

Head coach:  Dagur Sigurðsson

Macedonia 
A 28-player squad was announced on 10 December 2018. A 22-player team was revealed on 22 December 2018. On 30 December 2018 Tomislav Jagurinovski and Lasko Andonovski were excluded and the squad was reduced to 20 players. The final squad was announced on 9 January 2019.

Head coach:  Raúl González

Spain
A 19-player squad was announced on 17 December 2018. On 29 December 2018, Abel Serdio and Sergey Hernández were discarded from the squad.

Head coach: Jordi Ribera

Group C

Austria
A 28-player squad was announced on 10 December 2018. A 18-player squad was revealed on 27 December 2018. On 6 January, Alexander Hermann was excluded from the squad due to an injury.

Head coach:  Patrekur Jóhannesson

Chile
The final squad was announced on 31 December 2018.

Head coach:  Mateo Garralda

Denmark
A 28-player squad was announced on 10 December 2018. The final squad was announced on 19 December 2018. On 21 December 2018 Niclas Kirkeløkke was replaced by Martin Larsen because of an injury. On 2 January Hans Lindberg was replaced by Jóhan Hansen because of an injury. The same change was made on 12 January.

Head coach: Nikolaj Jacobsen

Norway
A 28-player squad was announced on 10 December 2018. The squad was reduced to 18 players on 14 December 2018. On 4 January 2019, it was announced that Kent Robin Tønnesen had to withdraw from the squad due to an injury, and was replaced by Harald Reinkind. On 14 January, Henrik Jakobsen replaced Petter Øverby in the squad. On 21 January, Øverby was added back in the squad and replaced Kevin Gulliksen.

Head coach: Christian Berge

Saudi Arabia
A 22-player squad was announced on 27 November 2018. The final squad was announced on 2 January 2019.

Head coach:  Boris Denič

Tunisia
A 18-player squad was revealed on 12 December 2018. A 17-player squad was revealed on 21 December 2018. The final squad was announced on 31 December 2018.

Head coach:  Antonio Gerona

Group D

Angola
A 19-player squad was announced on 20 November 2018. The final squad was announced on 28 December 2018.

Head coach: Filipe Cruz

Argentina
The final squad was announced on 28 December 2018.

Head coach:  Manolo Cadenas

Egypt
A 17-player squad was revealed on 28 November 2018. The final squad was announced on 7 January 2019.

Head coach:  David Davis

Hungary
A 28-player squad was announced on 10 December 2018. A 21-player squad was revealed on 18 December 2018. It was reduced to 18 players on 30 December 2018. The final squad was announced on 8 January 2019.

Head coach: István Csoknyai

Qatar
A 19-player squad was revealed on 18 December 2018. The final squad was announced on 5 January 2019.

Head coach:  Valero Rivera

Sweden
A 18-player squad was announced on 10 December 2018. On 27 December 2018 the squad was reduced to 17 players because Philip Henningsson was excluded from the squad due to injury. Hampus Wanne was included on 14 January 2019.

Head coach:  Kristján Andrésson

Coaches representation by country
Coaches in bold represented their own country.

References

World Men's Handball Championship squads
2019 squads